Abraham L. Cohn (May 24, 1898 – May 23, 1966) was an American politician who served part of one term in the Massachusetts House of Representatives.

Cohn was born on May 24, 1898 in Haverhill, Massachusetts. He attended public schools in Beverly, Massachusetts.

Cohn served as a member of the Beverly board of aldermen, citizen's urban renewal commission, and recreation commission. In 1964, he was elected to the Massachusetts House of Representatives as a Republican. Outside of politics, Cohn, along with his son Arlen was the proprietor of Alcon's Clothing Store in Beverly.

On May 23, 1966, Cohn collapsed at a meeting of the Beverly Mental Health Association and was rushed to Beverly Hospital, where he died later that night.

References

1898 births
1966 deaths
Republican Party members of the Massachusetts House of Representatives
People from Beverly, Massachusetts
20th-century American politicians